Ronald John Crayden (1920-2007), was a male international table tennis player from England.

Table tennis career
He made his England debut in 1948 against Wales. He competed at the 1951 World Table Tennis Championships, in the Swaythling Cup with Michael Thornhill, Brian Kennedy, Johnny Leach for England.

He was the non playing captain for the England men's team during the 1961 and 1963 Swaythling Cup and the women's team for the Corbillon Cup, from 1961 to 1969. He was captain of England 225 times.

Personal life
He wrote many books on table tennis including a book called 'The Story of Table Tennis - the First 100 Years'. He married Jean Mary Ricketts.

See also
 List of England players at the World Team Table Tennis Championships

References

English male table tennis players
1920 births
2007 deaths